East Union Township is one of the sixteen townships of Wayne County, Ohio, United States.  The 2000 census found 6,527 people in the township, 5,528 of whom lived in the unincorporated portions of the township.

Geography
Located in the central part of the county, it borders the following townships:
Green Township - north
Baughman Township - northeast corner
Sugar Creek Township - east
Paint Township - southeast corner
Salt Creek Township - south
Franklin Township - southwest
Wooster Township - west
Wayne Township - northwest corner

The village of Apple Creek is located in southern East Union Township.

Name and history
East Union Township was established in 1814, and named after Union, Maine, the native home of a first settler. It is the only East Union Township statewide.

Government
The township is governed by a three-member board of trustees, who are elected in November of odd-numbered years to a four-year term beginning on the following January 1. Two are elected in the year after the presidential election and one is elected in the year before it. There is also an elected township fiscal officer, who serves a four-year term beginning on April 1 of the year after the election, which is held in November of the year before the presidential election. Vacancies in the fiscal officership or on the board of trustees are filled by the remaining trustees.  As of 2019, the members of the board were Joseph Rabatin, Dan Hodge, and Blake Meier, and the fiscal officer was Valorie Lewis.

References

External links
Township website
Wayne County township map
County website

Townships in Wayne County, Ohio
Townships in Ohio